Andrew Martin Walker (born March 25, 1955) is a retired professional basketball small forward who spent one season in the National Basketball Association (NBA) as a member of the New Orleans Jazz (1976–77). Born in Long Island City, New York, Walker attended Niagara University and was drafted by the Jazz in the seventh round of the 1976 NBA draft.

References

External links

1955 births
Living people
American men's basketball players
Basketball coaches from New York (state)
New Orleans Jazz draft picks
New Orleans Jazz players
Niagara Purple Eagles men's basketball coaches
Niagara Purple Eagles men's basketball players
Small forwards
Sportspeople from Queens, New York
Basketball players from New York City
People from Long Island City, Queens